Over The Border is a lost American drama film released by Paramount Pictures in 1922. It stars Betty Compson and Tom Moore in a story about "love and thrills beneath the northern lights". It was adapted from Sir Gilbert Parker's "She of the Triple Chevron".

Plot
As described in a film magazine, Jen Galbraith (Compson), the daughter of a bootlegger on the Canadian boarder, and Sgt. Tom Flaherty (Moore) of the North-West Mounted Police are in love, and the young woman often begs him to give up his job as a policeman. Tom has secretly turned in his resignation, but it is not yet in effect. While Jen is riding home through the snow one night she is mistaken for a spy of the moonshiners and is shot at by the police. She returns the fire and wounds an officer's horse. The police follow a trail that leads to her home with Tom arriving at the bootleggers camp at about the same time and seeking to divert suspicion from his girl. Her father and brother are arrested, and Jen turns from her lover in anger. The prisoners are freed on bail and plan to ship the liquor across the border into the United States and forfeit their bail. A spy is shot by Jen's brother and Sgt. Flaherty is sent to follow the slayer through a blizzard. Stopping at Jen's home, he is drugged by her father, but Jen carries Tom's sealed orders to the headquarters post. Tom follows and pretends that he has the authority to take the prisoner back with him. With his commission now expired, he tricks his former fellow officers and aids Jen's brother to escape. This brings about a reconciliation between Tom and Jen.

Cast
Betty Compson as Jen Galbraith
Tom Moore as Sgt. Tom Flaherty
J. Farrell MacDonald as Peter Galbraith
Casson Ferguson as Val Galbraith
Sidney D'Albrook as Snow Devil
Lee Shumway as Cpl. Byng
Jean De Briac as Pretty Pierre
Ed Brady as Inspector Jules
Joe Ray as Borden

See also

Heart of the Wilds (1918)

References

External links

1922 films
Lost American films
Films based on short fiction
Films based on works by Gilbert Parker
Paramount Pictures films
1920s romance films
American black-and-white films
American silent feature films
Remakes of American films
American romance films
1922 lost films
Lost romance films
1920s American films
1920s English-language films